A riding mechanic was a mechanic that rode along with a race car during races, and who was tasked with maintaining, monitoring, and repairing the car during the race. The various duties included manually pumping oil and fuel, checking tire wear, observing gauges, and even massaging the driver's hands. They also communicated with the pits and spotted from inside the car. If the car ran out of fuel, or otherwise broke down, the riding mechanic was usually responsible for running back to the pits to fetch fuel or the necessary spare parts.

Riding mechanics were also referred to by the term mechanician. The position is largely associated with the early years of Championship car racing and the Indianapolis 500; however, they were also utilized in grand prix racing for a period of time.

History

Indianapolis 500

Riding mechanics were used by most cars in the Indianapolis 500 from 1911 to 1922, and again from 1930 to 1937. In the first 500, driver Ray Harroun notably drove solo, the only car in the field without a riding mechanic. He famously affixed a rear-view mirror to the car, in order to see cars behind him (a task normally assigned to the mechanic). Harroun is famously regarded as the first driver to utilize a rear view mirror on a race car, however, he said he got the idea from seeing a mirror used for the same purpose on a horse-drawn vehicle in 1904.

Starting in 1912, the AAA Contest Board declared that riding mechanics were made mandatory for all races of 100 miles or longer (which included Indianapolis). In 1923 riding mechanics were made optional, and only one team utilized them. They were brought back from 1930 to 1937 and made mandatory once again. From 1938 on, they were again declared optional, but no teams in the starting field used one ever again. In the years immediately following WWII, nearly all two-man cars had been parked, or converted to single-seaters. Riding mechanics were not formally written out of the rule book until 1964.

The mechanics sat in a passenger seat, typically to the outside of the driver, a precarious position close to the retaining wall. Some cars, however, did have the positions reversed, with the riding mechanic on the inside. Due to the close quarters, many were of short stature and small build.

Some notable riding mechanics are Harry Holcomb, Robert Bandini, and Monk Jordan. The last living Indy 500 riding mechanic, Joseph F. Kennelly, died in September 2011.  A small handful of riding mechanics were also drivers in their own right. The 1922 Indianapolis 500 winner Jimmy Murphy started his racing career as a riding mechanic. Pete DePaolo and Kelly Petillo also served as mechanicians. While accurate records are incomplete and spotty overall, the identification of riding mechanics from the history of the Indianapolis 500 is mostly complete and fairly reliable.

Grand Prix
Riding mechanics were also required in the classic era of grand prix. Riding mechanics were banned in Europe after the death of Tom Barrett in 1924.

Other Riding Mechanics:
Bruce McLaren

Indianapolis 500 winning riding mechanics

Notes
In 1911, riding mechanics were optional, and the race-winning entry (Ray Harroun) did not utilize one.
In 1919 Leo Banks replaced the originally listed Maurice Becker. Becker was disallowed by his family from participating in the race.
From 1923 to 1929, riding mechanics were optional, and in each of those years, the winning entry did not utilize one.
Starting in 1938, riding mechanics were once again optional, and were not utilized by any of the competitors.

Fatalities
List of fatal accidents involving riding mechanics
List of fatal accidents involving riding mechanics at the Indianapolis Motor Speedway

See also
Co-driver

References

Further reading
Forgotten Heroes of the Speedways: The Riding Mechanics, by John E. Blazier and Tom Rollings, 1994.

Indianapolis 500
Motorsport terminology